Megachile susurrans is a species of bee in the family Megachilidae. It was described by Haliday in 1836.

References

Susurrans
Insects described in 1836